Massilia yuzhufengensis is a Gram-negative, rod-shaped, aerobic and motile bacterium from the genus Massilia with a polar flagella which has been isolated from the Yuzhufeng Glacier from the Tibetan Plateau in China.

References

Further reading

External links
Type strain of Massilia yuzhufengensis at BacDive -  the Bacterial Diversity Metadatabase

Burkholderiales
Bacteria described in 2013